The 1973 Columbia Lions football team was an American football team that represented Columbia University during the 1973 NCAA Division I football season. Columbia finished second-to-last in the Ivy League. 

In their sixth and final season under head coach Frank Navarro, the Lions compiled a 1–7–1 record and were outscored 274 to 58. Mike Evans and Ted Gregory were the team captains.  

The Lions' 1–6 conference record placed seventh in the Ivy League standings. Columbia was outscored 246 to 56 by Ivy opponents. 

Columbia played its home games at Baker Field in Upper Manhattan, in New York City.

Schedule

References

Columbia
Columbia Lions football seasons
Columbia Lions football